Pyrgospira is a genus of sea snails, marine gastropod mollusks in the family Pseudomelatomidae, the turrids and allies

Species
Species within the genus Pyrgospira include:

Pyrgospira aenone Dall, 1919
Pyrgospira candace (Dall, 1919)
Pyrgospira ostrearum (Stearns, 1872)
Pyrgospira tampaensis (Bartsch & Rehder, 1939)

Species brought into synonymy
 † Pyrgospira acurugata Dall, 1890: synonym of † Strictispira acurugata (Dall, 1890)  
Pyrgospira fuscescens (Reeve, 1843): synonym of Crassispira fuscescens (Reeve, 1843)
Pyrgospira nautica Pilsbry & Lowe, 1932: synonym of Pyrgospira aenone (Dall, 1919)
Pyrgospira obeliscus (Reeve, 1845): synonym of Pyrgospira aenone (Dall, 1919)
Pyrgospira plicosa (Adams C. B., 1850): synonym of Pyrgocythara plicosa (C. B. Adams, 1850)
Pyrgospira tomliniana Melvill, 1927 : synonym of Pyrgospira aenone (Dall, 1919)

References

External links

Bouchet, P.; Kantor, Y. I.; Sysoev, A.; Puillandre, N. (2011). A new operational classification of the Conoidea (Gastropoda). Journal of Molluscan Studies. 77(3): 273-308
McLean, J.H. (1971) A revised classification of the family Turridae, with the proposal of new subfamilies, genera, and subgenera from the Eastern Pacific. The Veliger, 14, 114–130
Worldwide Mollusc Species Data Base: Pseudomelatomidae
 Bouchet, P.; Kantor, Y. I.; Sysoev, A.; Puillandre, N. (2011). A new operational classification of the Conoidea (Gastropoda). Journal of Molluscan Studies. 77(3): 273-308

 
Pseudomelatomidae
Gastropod genera